À Suivre or A SUIVRE (English translation: "To Be Continued") was a Franco-Belgian comics magazine published from February 1978 to December 1997 by the Casterman publishing house. Along with the comic book magazines Spirou, Tintin, Pilote, and Metal Hurlant, it is considered to have been one of the major vehicles for the development of Franco-Belgian comics during the 20th century.

History and profile
À Suivre was established by Casterman publishing house in 1978. The magazine was published on a monthly basis. It presented the work of major European comic book artists including Hugo Pratt, Jean-Claude Forest, Alexandro Jodorowsky, Milo Manara, Masse, Jean (Mœbius) Giraud, Jacques Tardi, François Bourgeon, F'Murr, Ted Benoît, Guido Crepax, Vittorio Giardino, François Schuiten, Benoît Sokal and François Boucq. It was a pioneer in introducing graphic novels.

In the early 1990s À Suivre was printed almost in full colour.

See also
 List of magazines in Belgium

References 

 La mémoire de (A SUIVRE) on BD oubliées

1978 comics debuts
1978 establishments in Belgium
1997 disestablishments in Belgium
Comics magazines published in Belgium
Monthly magazines published in Belgium
Comics anthologies
Defunct magazines published in Belgium
French-language magazines
Magazines established in 1978
Magazines disestablished in 1997
Magazines about comics